The 1946 Rice Owls football team was an American football team that represented Rice University in the Southwest Conference (SWC) during the 1946 college football season. In their seventh year under head coach Jess Neely, the Owls compiled a 9–2 record (5–1 against SWC opponents), tied with Arkansas for the conference championship, outscored all opponents by a total of 245 to 62, and were ranked No. 10 in the final AP Poll. They were invited to the 1947 Orange Bowl where they defeated SEC co-champion No. 7 Tennessee.

Rice ranked fifth nationally in total defense, allowing opponents to gain an average of only 166.3 yards per game. It also ranked fifth among 120 major college teams in scoring defense, allowing an average of 5.6 points per game.

Back Carl Russ led Rice and ranked 11th nationally with 690 rushing yards and an average of 5.31 yards per carry. Guard Weldon Humble was a consensus first-team All-American. Five Rice players received honors from the Associated Press (AP) or United Press (UP) on the 1946 All-Southwest Conference football team: Carl Russ (AP-1, UP-1); Weldon Humble (AP-1, UP-1); back Huey Keeney (AP-1, UP-1); tackle Charles Malmberg (AP-2, UP-1); and end Win Williams (AP-2, UP-2).

The team played its home games at Rice Field in Houston.

Schedule

After the season

The 1947 NFL Draft was held on December 16, 1946. The following Owls were selected.

References

Rice
Rice Owls football seasons
Southwest Conference football champion seasons
Orange Bowl champion seasons
Rice Owls football